Let It Roll is the second (and to date final) studio album by American actor and singer Don Johnson, released on September 20, 1989, by Epic Records. Barbra Streisand contributed background vocals to "What If It Takes All Night". It also includes Johnson's rendition of "Tell It Like It Is".

Track listing

Personnel
Credits adapted from the liner notes of Let It Roll.

Musicians

 Don Johnson – lead vocals ; background vocals ; guitars 
 Omar Hakim – drums 
 Paul Pesco – bass ; guitars ; guitar solo ; acoustic guitar solo 
 Ira Siegel – guitars ; guitar solo 
 Keith Diamond – keyboards ; bass ; Hammond B3 organ, acoustic piano ; keyboard solo ; Fairlight, fingersnaps, percussion ; arrangements 
 Joe Lynn Turner – background vocals 
 Michael Camacho – background vocals 
 Curtis King – background vocals 
 Tracy Amos – background vocals 
 Kennan Keating – additional guitars 
 Terry Silverlight – drums 
 Danny Wilensky – sax, horn solo, horn arrangements ; solo saxes, horn arrangements 
 Chris Botti – trumpet ; solo trumpet 
 Mike Davis – trombone 
 B.J. Nelson – background vocals 
 Janice Dempsey – background vocals 
 Cindy Mizelle – background vocals 
 Audrey Wheeler – background vocals 
 John Keane – drums 
 John Pierce – bass 
 Dave Resnik – guitars 
 Bruce Kulick – guitars, additional solo guitars 
 Steve Jones – guitars 
 Ron Schwartz – keyboards 
 Liz Constantine – background vocals 
 N'Dea – background vocals 
 Laura Creamer – background vocals 
 Jill Dell'Abate – background vocals 
 Yogi Lee – background vocals 
 Chrissy Faith – background vocals 
 EBN – Fairlight 
 Yuri – featured vocals, background vocals 
 Jeff Daniels – guitars 
 Acar Key – cymbals 
 Leon Pendarvis – horn arrangements ; string arrangements, string and horn conducting
 Carl James – bass 
 Bashiri Johnson – percussion 
 Kent Smith – trumpet 
 Rock Wilk – background vocals 
 Lauren Kinhan – background vocals 
 Larry Russell – bass 
 Louis Merlino – background vocals 
 Wayne Brathwaite – bass 
 Mike Jewel – keyboards 
 Barbra Streisand – background vocals 
 Debbe Cole – background vocals 
 Jesse Levy, Frederick Zlotkin, Eugene Moya, Lewis Eley, Julien C. Barber, Harold Coletta, Alfred V. Brown, Jesse L. Levine, Harry Lookofsky, Charles Libove, Regis Iandiorio, Gerald Tarack, Max Ellen – strings
 George Young, Alex Foster, Joseph J. Shepley, Jeffrey Kievit – horns

Technical
 Keith Diamond – production
 Acar Key – engineering
 Eddie Garcia, Bob Ross, Peter Robbins – additional engineering
 Debbie Cornish, George Karras, Laura Livingston, John McGlain – engineering assistance

Artwork
 Nancy Donald – art direction
 David Coleman – art direction
 Randee St. Nicholas – photography

Charts

Weekly charts

Year-end charts

Certifications

References

1989 albums
Don Johnson albums
Epic Records albums